Fumonelix is a genus of small, air-breathing, land snails, terrestrial pulmonate gastropod molluscs in the family Polygyridae.

Species 
Species in the genus Fumonelix include:

Fumonelix archeri – Ocoee covert, Archer's toothed land snail
Fumonelix cherohalaensis
Fumonelix christyi – glossy covert
Fumonelix jonesiana – big-tooth covert, Jones' middle-toothed land snail
Fumonelix langdoni
Fumonelix orestes – engraved covert
Fumonelix roanensis
Fumonelix wetherbyi – clifty covert
Fumonelix wheatleyi – cinnamon covert

References

Polygyridae